John Huddleston (died 1493) was an English politician.

He was a Member (MP) of the Parliament of England for Cumberland in 1467.

References

Year of birth missing
1493 deaths
English MPs 1467
People from Cumberland